Valdivianemertes is a genus of nemerteans belonging to the family Cratenemertidae.

The species of this genus are found in near Antarctica.

Species:

Valdivianemertes stannii 
Valdivianemertes valdiviae

References

Monostilifera
Nemertea genera